Asterothamnus is a genus of flowering plants belonging to the family Asteraceae.

Its native range is Central Asia to Southwestern Siberia and Northern China.

Species:

Asterothamnus alyssoides 
Asterothamnus centrali-asiaticus 
Asterothamnus fruticosus 
Asterothamnus heteropappoides 
Asterothamnus molliusculus 
Asterothamnus poliifolius 
Asterothamnus schischkinii

References

Astereae
Asteraceae genera